Les Salles-Lavauguyon is a commune in the Haute-Vienne department in the Nouvelle-Aquitaine region in west-central France.

See also
Communes of the Haute-Vienne department

References

External links

 Information regarding the Church and frescoes at Les Salles-Lavauguyon

Communes of Haute-Vienne